The 2021 Atlantic Coast Conference (ACC) softball tournament was held at Ulmer Stadium on the campus of the University of Louisville in Louisville, Kentucky from May 12 through May 15, 2021.  The event determined the champion of the Atlantic Coast Conference for the 2021 season.  As the winner of the tournament, Duke earned the ACC's automatic bid to the 2021 NCAA Division I softball tournament.

This was the third year of a 10-team tournament. The first round, quarterfinals and semifinals were be shown on the ACC Network. The championship game was broadcast by ESPN2.

Format and seeding
The top 10 finishers of the ACC's 13 softball-player members will be seeded based on conference results from the regular season.  The bottom four seeds will play in an opening round to determine the quarterfinal matchups.

Tournament

Bracket

Game schedule and results

Championship game

All Tournament Team

MVP in boldSource:

References

2021 Atlantic Coast Conference softball season
Atlantic Coast Conference softball tournament
ACC softball tournament